Krapivna is the name of several rural localities in Russia:
Krapivna, Klimovsky District, Bryansk Oblast, a selo in Getmanobudsky Selsoviet of Klimovsky District of Bryansk Oblast
Krapivna, Starodubsky District, Bryansk Oblast, a village in Mokhonovsky Selsoviet of Starodubsky District of Bryansk Oblast
Krapivna, Kaluga Oblast, a selo in Ulyanovsky District of Kaluga Oblast
Krapivna, Monastyrshchinsky District, Smolensk Oblast, name of two villages in Slobodskoye Rural Settlement of Monastyrshchinsky District of Smolensk Oblast
Krapivna, Roslavlsky District, Smolensk Oblast, a village in Krapivenskoye Rural Settlement of Roslavlsky District of Smolensk Oblast
Krapivna, Tula Oblast, a selo in Krapivenskaya Rural Administration of Shchyokinsky District of Tula Oblast
Krapivna, Yaroslavl Oblast, a village in Yudinsky Rural Okrug of Poshekhonsky District of Yaroslavl Oblast